Krasnoyar is a rural locality (a village) in Slakbashevsky Selsoviet, Belebeyevsky District, Bashkortostan, Russia. The population was 94 as of 2010. There is one street.

Geography 
Krasnoyar is located 37 km southeast of Belebey (the district's administrative centre) by road. Kanash is the nearest rural locality.

References 

Rural localities in Belebeyevsky District